The Salé Rovers, also Sale Rovers or Salle Rovers, were a dreaded band of Barbary corsairs in the 17th century.  They formed the Republic of Salé on the Moroccan coast. The most famous of the rovers was Jan Janszoon, a Dutchman who had been a pirate for Holland in the Mediterranean. He "turned Turk" i.e. converted to Islam after being captured by one of the Moorish states in 1618 and became known as Murat Reis.

See also
Anglo-Turkish piracy
Ahmed el Inglizi

References

 5. C.S. Forester The Barbary Pirates 1953

Barbary pirates